The crimson-rumped myzomela (Myzomela eichhorni) or yellow-vented myzomela, is a species of bird in the family Meliphagidae.
It is endemic to the Western Province (Solomon Islands).

References

crimson-rumped myzomela
Birds of the Western Province (Solomon Islands)
crimson-rumped myzomela
Taxonomy articles created by Polbot